Ang Soon Tong is a secret society based in Singapore and Malaysia. According to a former police officer, the society was active as early as the 1950s, mainly in the Sembawang area. In 1998, a 19-year-old youth was arrested for setting up a website dedicated to the society.

As recently as 2020, Ang Soon Tong is still active, with one of its members sentenced to reformative probation that year for clashing with members of another secret society.

The gang gain profits through illegal activities such as smuggling and trading of gun and drugs, illegal moneylending and illegal gambling.

Notable members

Tan Chor Jin
Tan Chor Jin, nick named One-eye dragon, was a member of Ang Soon Tong. He is known for shooting a nightclub owner, Lim Hock Soon, to death with a Beretta Pistol inside Lim's flat at Serangoon, Singapore. After the shoot out, Tan fled to Malaysia and attempted to travel to Chiang Mai at Thailand, to escape justice. Tan was arrested by Royal Malaysia Police at a Hotel in Kuala Lumpur and was sentenced to death by Singapore's High Court in year 2007. He was hanged at dawn on 9 January 2009.

Incident

Gang fight over funeral banner 
In December 1995, the Ang Soon Tong gang clashes with the See Tong gang over a funeral banner. The gang members were arrested and charged with imprisonment.

Leong Fook Weng murder incident 
Leong Fook Weng, a former Ang Soon Tong gang member went on to quit Ang Soon Tong and joined the Loh Kuan secret society. See Chee Keong and four other gang members decided to punish Leong for quitting the gang and assaulted Leong Fook Weng 4 times in total on 17 May 2000 in Singapore. One of the attacks was at the Upper Boon Keng Road. Another attack happened later at a petrol station near Tanjong Katong Road. The last attack on Leong happened between 4.30 a.m. to 6.30 a.m. at the vacant land. During the attack, See Chee Keong stabbed Leong's heart and neck with a 5 cm long blade hidden in a lighter, which resulted in Leong's death. A few hours later, Leong's body was discovered only in his underwear. See Chee Keong fled to Thailand on 18 May 2000, a day after the assault on Leong. In December 2000, See was arrested at Phnom Penh International Airport in Cambodia while attempting to smuggle illegal drugs to Kuala Lumpur. See was charged in Cambodia court and sentenced to 18 years of imprisonment for drug trafficking. After serving sentence in prison for 13 years, See received a royal pardon and was released on 26 November 2013 and was deported to Singapore.

On 20 April 2016, three Ang Soon Tong gang members involved in the murdering incident, See Chee Keong, Robson Tay Teik Chai, and William Ho Kah Wei were charged in Singapore court and sentenced to imprisonment and caning for murdering Leong Fook Weng. The two other fugitives, Ong Chin Huat, and Lim Hin Teck were still on the run at that time.

Gang member harasses Yishun resident 
An Ang Soon Tong gang member, known as Tiger Boy, ransomed $100 Singapore Dollars from Julius Chen, a resident living at Yishun Singapore, because Tiger Boy "dislike Chen's face". Chen later saw Tiger Boy again at a coffee shop at Block 414 on 30 March 2019. Chen attempt to take back his $100 and confronted Tiger Boy. Tiger Boy respond by claiming that he is Ang Soon Tong gang member and made a phone call for backup, six Indian men later arrived at coffee shop. One of the Indian man called Chen crazy and threatened to punch Chen when he called the police. The police later arrived and separated Chen and the gang, and give a warning to the gang.

Extortion and assault in Klang, Malaysia 2015 
Ang Soon Tong attempted to control areas in Klang, a city in Malaysia, by sending gang members with parangs and katanas to assault 2 gardening contractors who refused to pay for the gang's extortion at a construction site in Pulau Indah on 4 September 2015. The 2 gardening contractors were fatally injured and hospitalized. The Royal Malaysia Police later arrested 12 Ang Soon Tong gang members and issued a wanted notice to search for the local gang leader.

See also 

 Secret societies in Singapore
 Secret society

References

Secret societies in Singapore
Organized crime groups in Malaysia
Organised crime groups in Singapore
Triad groups